Maricopa County is in the south-central part of the U.S. state of Arizona. As of the 2020 census the population was 4,420,568, or about 62% of the state's total, making it the fourth-most populous county in the United States, the most populous county in Arizona, and making Arizona one of the nation's most centralized states. The county seat is Phoenix, the state capital and fifth-most populous city in the United States.

Maricopa County is the central county of the Phoenix-Mesa-Chandler, AZ, Metropolitan Statistical Area. The Office of Management and Budget renamed the metropolitan area in September 2018. Previously, it was the Phoenix-Mesa-Glendale metropolitan area, and in 2000, that was changed to Phoenix-Mesa-Scottsdale.

Maricopa County was named after the Maricopa Native Americans. Five Native American Reservations are located in the county. The largest are the Salt River Pima-Maricopa Indian Community (east of Scottsdale) and the Gila River Indian Community (south of Chandler).

Geography
Maricopa County is one of the largest counties in the United States by area, with a land area greater than that of four other US states. It is by far Arizona's most populous county, encompassing well over half of the state's residents. It is the largest county in the United States to have a capital city.

Adjacent counties
 La Paz County – west
 Yuma County – west
 Pima County – south
 Pinal County – southeast and south
 Gila County – east
 Yavapai County – north

National protected areas
 Sonoran Desert National Monument (part)
 Tonto National Forest (part)

Regional parks
Maricopa county has 14 regional parks, namely Adobe Mountain Desert Park, Chaparral Lake, Estrella Mountain Regional Park,
Hassayampa River Preserve , Indian Mesa, Lake Pleasant Regional Park, Litchfield Park, Arizona , Manistee Ranch, McCormick-Stillman Railroad Park, Papago Park, Phoenix Mountains Preserve , Sahuaro Ranch, San Tan Mountain Regional Park, White Tank Mountain Regional Park.

It also has at least 21 protected areas:
Big Horn Mountains Wilderness
Daisy Mountain Preserve
Deer Valley Petroglyph Preserve
Eagletail Mountains Wilderness
Harquahala Mountains
Hells Canyon Wilderness (Arizona)
Hummingbird Springs Wilderness
Mesa Grande
Mummy Mountain (Arizona)
National Memorial Cemetery of Arizona
Painted Rock Petroglyph Site
Sierra Estrella
Signal Mountain Wilderness
Sonoran Desert National Monument
St. Francis Catholic Cemetery
Superstition Mountains
Table Top Mountain (Arizona)
Tonto National Forest
Wabayuma Peak
White Tank Mountain Regional Park
Woolsey Peak

Flora and fauna
From 2009 to 2011, an inventory of all vascular plants growing along the Salt River (Arizona), Gila River, New River and Agua Fria River and their tributaries in the Phoenix metropolitan area was done.
In October 2022, Maricopa County Environmental Services Department detected Dengue virus in mosquitoes they had trapped; in November the first locally transmitted case of dengue fever was reported in the County and Arizona state as a whole - previous dengue cases in Maricopa County had been related to travel.

Demographics

Racial and ethnic composition since 1960

2000 census
As of the census of 2000, 3,072,149 people, 1,132,886 households, and 763,565 families were living in the county. The population density was 334 people/sq mi (129/km2). The 1,250,231 housing units  averaged of 136/sq mi (52/km2). The racial makeup of the county was 77.4% White, 3.7% African American, 1.9% Native American, 2.2% Asian,  12.0% from other races, and 2.9% from two or more races. About 29.5% of the population were Hispanics or Latinos of any race. About 19.1% reported speaking Spanish at home.

Of the 1,132,886 households, 33.0% had children under  18 living with them, 51.6% were married couples living together, 10.7% had a female householder with no husband present, and 32.6% were not families. About 24.5% of all households were made up of individuals, and 7.9% had someone living alone who was 65  or older. The average household size was 2.67, and the average family size was 3.21.

The age distribution in the county was 27.0% under  18, 10.2% from 18 to 24, 31.4% from 25 to 44, 19.8% from 45 to 64, and 11.7% who were 65 or older. The median age was 33 years. For every 100 females, there were 100.10 males. For every 100 females age 18 and over, there were 98.10 males.

Males had a median income of $36,858 versus $28,703 for females. The per capita income for the county was $22,251. About 8.0% of families and 11.7% of the population were below the poverty line, including 15.4% of those under age 18 and 7.4% of those age 65 or over.

2010 census
As of the 2010 census,  3,817,117 people, 1,411,583 households, and 932,814 families were living in the county. The 1,639,279 housing units averaged . The racial makeup of the county was 73.0% white (58.7% non-Hispanic white), 5.0% African American, 3.5% Asian, 2.1% American Indian, 0.2% Pacific islander, 12.8% from other races, and 3.5% from two or more races. Those of Hispanic or Latino origin made up 29.6% of the population. The largest ancestry groups were:

 25.6% Mexican
 16.2% German
 10.6% Irish
 9.7% English
 5.2% American
 5.1% Italian
 2.8% Polish
 2.8% French
 2.0% Scottish
 1.9% Norwegian
 1.8% Swedish
 1.6% Dutch
 1.5% Scotch-Irish
 1.0% Russian

Of the 1,411,583 households, 35.1% had children under 18 living with them, 47.8% were married couples living together, 12.4% had a female householder with no husband present, 33.9% were not families, and 25.9% of all households were made up of individuals. The average household size was 2.67 and the average family size was 3.25. The median age was 34.6 years.

The median income for a household in the county was $55,054 and the median income for a family was $65,438. Males had a median income of $45,799 versus $37,601 for females. The per capita income for the county was $27,816. About 10.0% of families and 13.9% of the population were below the poverty line, including 19.8% of those under age 18 and 7.0% of those age 65 or over.

According to data provided by the United States Census Bureau in October 2015 and collected from 2009 to 2013, 73.7% of the population aged five years and over spoke only English at home, while 20.3% spoke Spanish, 0.6% spoke Chinese, 0.5% Vietnamese, 0.4% Tagalog, 0.4% Arabic, 0.4% German, 0.3% French, 0.3% Navajo, 0.2% Korean, 0.2% Hindi, 0.2% Italian, 0.1% Persian, 0.1% Russian, 0.1% Serbo-Croatian, 0.1% Telugu, 0.1% Polish, 0.1% Syriac, 0.1% Japanese, 0.1% spoke Romanian, and 0.1% spoke other Native North American languages at home.

Religion
In 2010 statistics, the largest religious group in Maricopa County was the Diocese of Phoenix, with 519,950 Catholics worshipping at 99 parishes, followed by 242,732 LDS Mormons with 503 congregations, 213,640 non-denominational adherents with 309 congregations, 93,252 AG Pentecostals with 120 congregations, 73,207 SBC Baptists with 149 congregations, 35,804 Christian churches and churches of Christ Christians with 29 congregations, 30,014 ELCA Lutherans with 47 congregations, 28,634 UMC Methodists with 55 congregations, 18,408 LCMS Lutherans with 34 congregations, and 15,001 PC-USA Presbyterians with 42 congregations. Altogether, 39.1% of the population was claimed as members by religious congregations, although members of historically African-American denominations were underrepresented due to incomplete information. In 2014, the county had 1,177 religious organizations, the fifth most out of all US counties.

Government, policing, and politics

Government
The governing body of Maricopa County is its board of supervisors. The Maricopa County Board of Supervisors consists of five members chosen by popular vote within their own districts. Currently, the board consists of four Republicans and one Democrat. Each member serves a four-year term, with no term limits.

Maricopa County sheriff
The Maricopa County Sheriff's Office provides court protection, administers the county jail, and patrols the unincorporated areas of the county plus incorporated towns by contract.

Politics
For much of the time after World War II, Maricopa County was one of the more conservative urban counties in the United States. While the city of Phoenix has been evenly split between the two major parties, most of the rest of the county was strongly Republican. Until 2020, every Republican presidential candidate since 1952 had carried Maricopa County. This includes the 1964 presidential run of native son Barry Goldwater, who would not have carried his own state had it not been for a 21,000-vote margin in Maricopa County. Until 2020, it was the largest county in the country to vote Republican. From 1968 to 2016, Democrats  held the margin within single digits only three times–in 1992, 1996, and 2016. In 2020, Joe Biden became the first Democrat in 72 years to win the county, which flipped Arizona to the Democratic column for the first time since 1996 and only the second time since 1948. Furthermore, Biden became the first presidential candidate to win more than one million votes in the county. This makes Maricopa County the third county in American history to cast more than one million votes for a presidential candidate. The county is also a statewide bellwether, voting for the statewide winning candidate in all elections except 1996.

Despite its consistent Republican allegiance since 1952, its fast-growing Hispanic population and influx of conservative retirees and Mormons, which were traditionally conservative voting blocs but were increasingly skeptical of President Donald Trump, signaled that it was a crucial bellwether in the 2020 election.

Despite its political leanings at the time, Maricopa County voted against Proposition 107 in the 2006 election. This referendum, designed to ban gay marriage and restrict domestic partner benefits, was rejected by a  51.6–48.4% margin within the county, and statewide by a similar margin. Two years later, however, a majority of county residents voted to pass a successful state constitutional amendment banning same-sex marriage. The amendment was later invalidated by the Supreme Court's 2015 ruling in Obergefell v. Hodges, which declared that same-sex marriage is a fundamental right in the United States.

Unlike cities and towns in Arizona, counties are politically and legally subordinate to the state and do not have charters of their own. The county Board of Supervisors acts under powers delegated by state law, mainly related to minor ordinances and revenue collection. With few exceptions, these powers are narrowly construed.The chairperson of the board presides for a one-year term, selected by the board members during a public hearing.

The County Sheriff, County Attorney, County Assessor, County Treasurer, Superintendent of Schools, County Recorder, Constables, Justices of the Peace, and Clerk of the Superior Court are elected by the people. Retention of Superior Court Judges is also determined by popular vote.

The county's dominant political figure for over two decades (from 1993 to 2017) was Sheriff Joe Arpaio, who called himself "America's Toughest Sheriff" and gained national notoriety for his flamboyant and often controversial practices and policies.

Maricopa County is home to 62 percent of the state's population and therefore dominates Arizona's politics. For example, in the 2018 Senate election, Democrat Kyrsten Sinema carried the county en route to becoming the first Democrat to win a Senate seat in Arizona since 1988. She won the county by over 60,000 votes, more than enough for the victory; she won statewide by 55,900 votes. All but one of the state's nine congressional districts include part of the county, and five of the districts have their population center located there. Most of the state's prominent elected officials live in the county. Further underlining Maricopa County's political dominance, Biden's margin of 45,109 votes was more than enough to carry the state; he only won Arizona by 10,457 votes.

Elected officials

United States Congress

The 1st, 3rd, 4th, 5th and 8th districts are all centered in Maricopa County. The 2nd and 9th are centered in rural Arizona, while the 7th is primarily Tucson-based.

Board of Supervisors

Elected county officials

†Member was originally appointed to the office.

Education
 Maricopa County Library District operates the county libraries in Maricopa County.
 The Maricopa County School Superintendent is charged with the general conduct and supervision of the public school system in Maricopa County. The Superintendent is one of six county-wide elected officials, elected by the voters of Maricopa County every four years. Since the inception of the office, there have been thirteen Maricopa County School Superintendents. The incumbent, Steve Watson, took office January 1, 2017.

K-12 schools
School districts with territory in the county (no matter how slight, even if the administration and schools are in other counties) include:

Unified:

 Cave Creek Unified School District
 Chandler Unified School District
 Deer Valley Unified District
 Dysart Unified School District
 Fountain Hills Unified School District
 Gila Bend Unified School District
 Gilbert Unified School District
 Higley Unified School District
 Mesa Unified School District
 Nadaburg Unified School District
 Paradise Valley Unified School District
 Peoria Unified School District
 Queen Creek Unified School District
 Saddle Mountain Unified School District
 Scottsdale Unified School District
 Wickenburg Unified School District

Secondary:
 Agua Fria Union High School District
 Buckeye Union High School District
 Glendale Union High School District
 Phoenix Union High School District
 Tempe Union High School District
 Tolleson Union High School District

Elementary:

 Aguila Elementary School District
 Alhambra Elementary School District
 Arlington Elementary School District
 Avondale Elementary School District
 Balsz Elementary School District
 Buckeye Elementary School District
 Cartwright Elementary School District
 Creighton Elementary School District
 Fowler Elementary School District
 Glendale Elementary School District
 Isaac Elementary School District
 Kyrene Elementary School District
 Laveen Elementary School District
 Liberty Elementary School District
 Litchfield Elementary School District
 Littleton Elementary School District
 Madison Elementary School District
 Mobile Elementary School District
 Morristown Elementary School District
 Murphy Elementary School District
 Osborn Elementary School District
 Palo Verde Elementary School District
 Paloma School District
 Pendergast Elementary School District
 Phoenix Elementary School District
 Riverside Elementary School District
 Roosevelt Elementary School District
 Sentinel Elementary School District
 Tempe School District
 Tolleson Elementary School District
 Union Elementary School District
 Washington Elementary School District
 Wilson Elementary School District

There is also a state-operated school, Phoenix Day School for the Deaf.

The Phoenix Indian School was formerly in the county.

Transportation

Major highways

  Interstate 8
  Interstate 10
  Interstate 17
  U.S. Route 60
  Historic U.S. Route 80
  U.S. Route 93
  Loop 101
  Loop 202
  Loop 303
  State Route 51
  State Route 71
  State Route 74
  State Route 85
  State Route 87
  State Route 143
  State Route 347

Air
The major primary commercial airport of the county is Sky Harbor International Airport (PHX).

Other airports located in the county include:
 Phoenix-Mesa Gateway Airport in Mesa (AZA)
 Scottsdale Municipal Airport in Scottsdale (SCF)
 Deer Valley Airport in Deer Valley Village in Phoenix (DVT)
 Chandler Municipal Airport in Chandler (CHD)
 Phoenix Goodyear Airport in Goodyear (GYR)
 Glendale Municipal Airport in Glendale (GEU)
 Buckeye Municipal Airport in Buckeye (BXK)
 Falcon Field in Mesa (MSC)
 Gila Bend Municipal Airport in Gila Bend (E63)
 Wickenburg Municipal Airport in Wickenburg (E25)

Rail
In terms of freight rail, the Union Pacific Railroad and the Burlington Northern Santa Fe Railroad serve the county.

In terms of passenger rail, greater Phoenix is served by a light rail system. The county has no other passenger rail transport as Amtrak's Sunset Limited, which served Phoenix until June 2, 1996, has its closest stop in Maricopa in neighboring Pinal County. The train connects Maricopa to Tucson, Los Angeles, and New Orleans three times a week. However it does not stop in Phoenix itself.

Communities

Cities

Apache Junction
 Avondale
 Buckeye
 Chandler
 El Mirage
 Glendale
 Goodyear
 Litchfield Park
 Mesa
 Peoria (partly in Yavapai County)
 Phoenix (county seat)
 Scottsdale
 Surprise
 Tempe
 Tolleson

Towns

 Carefree
 Cave Creek
 Fountain Hills
 Gila Bend
 Gilbert
 Guadalupe
 Paradise Valley
 Queen Creek (partly in Pinal County)
 Wickenburg (partly in Yavapai County)
 Youngtown

Census-designated places

 Aguila
 Anthem
 Arlington
 Circle City
 Citrus Park
 Gila Crossing
 Kaka
 Komatke
 Maricopa Colony
 Morristown
 New River
 Rio Verde
 St. Johns
 Sun City
 Sun City West
 Sun Lakes
 Theba
 Tonopah
 Wintersburg
 Wittmann

Unincorporated communities

 Chandler Heights
 Co-op Village
 Desert Hills
 Fort McDowell
 Higley
 Laveen
 Liberty
 Mobile
 Palo Verde
 Rainbow Valley
 Sunflower
 Tortilla Flat
 Waddell

Ghost towns 

 Agua Caliente
 Alma
 Angel Camp
 Marinette
 Vulture City

Native American communities
 Fort McDowell Yavapai Nation
 Gila River Indian Community
 Salt River Pima–Maricopa Indian Community
 Tohono O'odham Indian Reservation

County population ranking
The population ranking of the following table is based on the 2020 census of Maricopa County.

† county seat

Climate

Economy
In 2019, the largest employers in Maricopa County were:

According to the Bureau of Economic Analysis, in 2019 the employment of Maricopa County in the following sectors was:

Maricopa produces far more Brassica than anywhere else in the state, including far more cabbage, collards, and mustard greens, and far more eggplant and greenhouse production of tomato. Slightly more kale is grown here than Yavapai, and a close second to Yuma for broccoli, cauliflower, and spinach, and to Yavapai for field tomato. The county is top for parsley and is tied with Pima for other fresh herbs. Some of the state's melon, okra, and bell pepper are also grown here.

Almost all the apricot, freestone peach, persimmon, and nectarine in the state are grown here. The county also ties for the highest amount of cling peach with Cochise, along with Pima produces almost all the pomegranate, and grows most of the kumquat. Maricopa's farms grow a middling amount of fig, grape (Vitis spp. including V. vinifera), and pear (Pyrus spp.) other than Bartlett. A small amount of plum is also produced here.

All of the boysenberry, half of the elderberry (along with Yavapai), and a small amount of the state's blackberry and strawberry are harvested here.

A large part of the vegetable seed in Arizona is grown here.

See also

 2021 Maricopa County presidential ballot audit
 History of Phoenix, Arizona
 Maricopa County Sheriff's Office
 Maricopa Trail
 National Register of Historic Places listings in Maricopa County, Arizona
 USS Maricopa County (LST-938)
 White Tank Mountain Regional Park

References

Further reading
 Maricopa County Sheriff's Office, Maricopa County Sheriff's Office History and Pictorial. Paducah, KY: Turner Publishing. Co., 2005.

External links

 
 
 Maricopa County Chamber of Commerce

 
Phoenix metropolitan area
Arizona placenames of Native American origin
1871 establishments in Arizona Territory
Populated places established in 1871